Kalateh-ye Hajji Shir Mohammad (also Romanized as Kalāteh-ye Ḩājjī Shīr Moḩammad; also known as Kalāteh-ye Ḩājj Shīr Moḩammad) is a village in Ghazali Rural District, Miyan Jolgeh District, Nishapur County, Razavi Khorasan Province, Iran. At the 2006 census, its population was 22, in 5 families.

References 

Populated places in Nishapur County